Satyavolu is a village in Eluru district of the Indian state of Andhra Pradesh. It is located in Pedapadu mandal of Eluru revenue division.

Demographics 

 Census of India, Satyavolu had a population of 3416. The total population constitute, 1737  males and 1679 females with a sex ratio of 967 females per 1000 males. 332 children are in the age group of 0–6 years with sex ratio of 1012. The average literacy rate stands at 69.97%.

References 

Villages in Eluru district